Rudolf Grossmann (1882–1942), known by his pseudonym Pierre Ramus, was an Austrian anarchist and pacifist.

Early life
Ramus was born into a Jewish family, the son of Sofie Polnauer from Moravia and Samuel Grossmann, a merchant from Hungary.

Grossmann was arrested for inciting a riot during the Paterson silk strike of 1902, where he was arrested alongside William MacQueen and Luigi Galleani.

Further reading 

 
 
 
  Full text online.
 

1882 births
1942 deaths
Austrian anarchists
Austrian pacifists
Austrian people of Czech-Jewish descent
Austrian people of Hungarian-Jewish descent
Jewish anarchists
Jewish emigrants from Nazi Germany
People who died at sea